David Owen Murray was an Anglican bishop in the late 20th and early 21st centuries.

His first post was at St Boniface's Cathedral, Bunbury. He then served at Lake Grace, Jerramungup and Mount Barker. He was Bishop of the Southern Region of the Anglican Diocese of Perth from 1991 until 2006.

References

Australian College of Theology alumni
20th-century Anglican bishops in Australia
21st-century Anglican bishops in Australia
Anglican Diocese of Perth
Living people
Assistant bishops in the Anglican Diocese of Perth
Year of birth missing (living people)